Silence is the lack of audible sound.

Silence or The Silence may also refer to:

Places
Silence, a district of southern Brussels, Belgium

People with the name
Silence Dogood, a pen name of Benjamin Franklin
Silence Mabuza (born 1977), South African boxer
Silence Wong (born 1989), Chinese pop singer
The Silence (producer) (Mark Maclaine), a British educator, director, and music producer

Arts, entertainment, and media

Fictional characters
Silence (Doctor Who), fictional aliens in Doctor Who
Lady Silence, an Inuk character in Dan Simmons' 2007 novel The Terror

Films and television series
Silence (1926 film), a silent film by Rupert Julian
Silence (1931 film), a film by Louis J. Gasnier and Max Marcin
Silence (1963 film), a Soviet two-part feature by Vladimir Basov
The Silence (1963 film), a film by Ingmar Bergman
Silence (1971 film), a film by Masahiro Shinoda based on the 1966 novel by Shūsaku Endō
The Silence (1975 film), a made-for-TV film about James Pelosi
The Silence (1998 film), a film by Mohsen Makhmalbaf
Cisza (film) or Silence, a 2001 Polish film by Michal Rosa
Dead Silence or Silence, a 2006 horror film
The Silence (2006 film), an Australian television film
Silence (2010 film), a Kannada film by Venugopal
The Silence (2010 film) or Das letzte Schweigen, a German film 
The Silence (TV series), a 2010 BBC TV series
Hiljaisuus or Silence, a 2011 Finnish film by Sakari Kirjavainen
Barfi! or  Silence, a 2012 Indian Hindi film
Silence (2013 film), an Indian Malayalam film
The Silence (2015 film), a Marathi film by Gajendra Ahirey
Silence (2016 film), a film by Martin Scorsese, also based on the Endō novel
The Silence (2019 film), a horror film by John R. Leonetti and based on the novel by Tim Lebbon
Silence (2020 film), a Tamil thriller film

Literature
Silence (1969 play), a short play by Harold Pinter, first performed in 1969
The Silence, a 1969 novel by Jens Bjørneboe, the third and final part in his History of Bestiality-trilogy
Silence (1999 play), a play by Moira Buffini
Silence (Balmont), an 1898 poetry collection
Silence (Kennaway novel), 1972 novel by James Kennaway
Silence (Fitzpatrick novel), a 2011 novel by Becca Fitzpatrick
Silence (Endō novel), a 1966 novel by Shūsaku Endō
"Silence", an 1839 poem by Edgar Allan Poe
Le Roman de Silence, a thirteenth-century Old French novel by Heldris of Cornwall
Silence: A Christian History, a 2013 book by Diarmaid MacCulloch
"Silence: A Fable", a short story by Edgar Allan Poe
Silence: Lectures and Writings, a 1961 collection of writings by John Cage
The Silence, a 2015 horror novel for Tim Lebbon
The Silence (novel), a 2020 novel by Don DeLillo

Music

Compositions 
4′33″ or Silence, a composition by John Cage
Silence, a composition by Charlie Haden
Silence, a composition by Halvor Haug
Silence, a composition by Michael Isaacson

Groups and labels 
Silence (band), a Slovene electronic music duo
Mott the Hoople, a British rock band formerly known as Silence
Silence 4, a Portuguese band
Silence Records, a Swedish record label
The Silence, an Australian band of the 1960s that featured Graham Goble, later of Little River Band
The Silence, a 1960s band from Leatherhead that evolved into John's Children

Albums 
Silence (Blindside album) (2002)
Silence (Anthony Braxton album) (1969)
Silence (Facemob album) (2002)
Silence (Charlie Haden album) (1989)
Silence (Tara MacLean album) (1996)
Silence (David Murray album)
Silence (Slapshock album) (2006)
Silence (Sonata Arctica album) (2001)
Silence (Unashamed album) (1994)
Underconstruction 1: Silence, a 2003 extended play album by Gigi D'Agostino
Silence, a 2014 album by Cadaveria
Silence, a 1987 album by Stephan Eicher

Songs 
"Silence" (Delerium song), 1999
"Silence" (Marshmello song), 2017
"Silence" (Stromae song), 2010
"Silence", by Aly & AJ from Insomniatic, 2007
"Silence", by Caligula's Horse from Moments from Ephemeral City, 2011
"Silence", by DragonForce from Reaching into Infinity, 2017
"The Silence", by Gamma Ray from Heading For Tomorrow, 1990
"Silence", by Gomez from Split the Difference, 2004
"Silence", by Jars of Clay from The Eleventh Hour, 2002
"Silence", by Level 42 from Staring at the Sun, 1988
"Silence", by Mike Posner from At Night, Alone, 2016
"Silence", by The Parlotones from Radiocontrolledrobot, 2005
"Silence", by Rainbow from Stranger in Us All, 1995
"Silence", by Seal from Seal 6: Commitment, 2010
"Silence", by Sevendust from Next, 2005
"Silence", by The Ting Tings from Sounds from Nowheresville, 2012
"Silence", by Vanilla Ninja from Love Is War, 2006
"Silence (Pretending's So Comfortable)", by As It Is from Never Happy, Ever After, 2015
"The Silence" (song), by Alexandra Burke, 2009
"The Silence", by Mayday Parade from Anywhere But Here, 2009
"The Sound of Silence", by Simon & Garfunkel, 1965

Television

Programs
Silence (TV series), a 2006 Taiwanese television series starring Vic Zhou
The Silence (TV series), a BBC One series about a deaf girl who witnesses a murder

Episodes
"Silence" (Death Note episode) (2007)
"Silence" (The Following), a 2015 episode of The Following
"The Silence" (Six Feet Under episode) (2005)
"The Silence" (The Twilight Zone), an episode of The Twilight Zone

Other uses in arts, entertainment, and media
Silence (video game), a 2016 point-and-click adventure game
Silence! The Musical, a 2003 off-Broadway musical parody of the film Silence of the Lambs

Other uses
Silence (charity), a Hong Kong charity for the deaf
Silence (climb), a difficult climbing route located in Flatanger, Norway
Silence, a brand name for lorazepam

See also
List of silent musical compositions
Quiet (disambiguation)
Silenced (disambiguation)
Silencing, a visual illusion
Silencio (disambiguation)
Silent (disambiguation)
Cylance